Novi Vrh is a small settlement in the Municipality of Apače in northeastern Slovenia.

References

External links 
Novi Vrh on Geopedia

Populated places in the Municipality of Apače